Lomatium dasycarpum is a species of flowering plant in the carrot family known by the common name woollyfruit desertparsley. It is native to California and Baja California, where it is widespread throughout many of the mountain ranges, including the Peninsular, Sierra Nevada, and California Coast Ranges,  and in valleys.

Description
Lomatium dasycarpum is a lightly hairy perennial herb up to about half a meter tall. The upright leaves emerge from the base of the plant, growing up to 24 centimeters long with blades divided into many small, narrow segments. The inflorescence is an umbel of hairy greenish or purplish flowers which yield woolly, flattened, disclike fruits up to 2 centimeters long.

External links
 Calflora Database: Lomatium dasycarpum (woollyfruit desertparsley, woolly fruited lomatium)
Jepson Manual eFlora (TJM2) treatment of Lomatium dasycarpum
USDA Plants Profile for Lomatium dasycarpum
UC Photos gallery — Lomatium dasycarpum

dasycarpum
Flora of Baja California
Flora of the Sierra Nevada (United States)
Natural history of the California chaparral and woodlands
Natural history of the California Coast Ranges
Natural history of the Peninsular Ranges
Natural history of the Transverse Ranges
Flora without expected TNC conservation status